David B. Lyons is a United States Air Force major general who serves as the director of air and space operations of the Air Combat Command. He has was commanded the 455th Air Expeditionary Wing. In February 2021, he was nominated for promotion to major general.

References

External links

Year of birth missing (living people)
Living people
Place of birth missing (living people)
United States Air Force generals